The 1979 Austrian Grand Prix was a Formula One motor race held on 12 August 1979 at Österreichring.

Qualifying

Qualifying classification

Race

Classification

Championship standings after the race 

Drivers' Championship standings

Constructors' Championship standings

Note: Only the top five positions are included for both sets of standings. Only the best 4 results from the first 7 races and the best 4 results from the last 8 races counted towards the Drivers' Championship. Numbers without parentheses are Championship points; numbers in parentheses are total points scored.

References

Austrian Grand Prix
Grand Prix
Austrian Grand Prix
Austrian Grand Prix